What Do You Think About the Car? is the debut studio album by English singer-songwriter and musician Declan McKenna. It was released worldwide on 21 July 2017 through Columbia Records. Singles for the record – most notably "Brazil", were released as early as 2015. Lyrically, the album sees McKenna focus on a number of political and social issues such as corruption in the FIFA World Cup and transgender suicide. The album peaked at number 11 on the UK Album Charts and number 8 in Scotland.

Composition
What Do You Think About the Car? has been described as featuring indie rock throughout. In 2015, at age 15, McKenna won the Glastonbury Festival's Emerging Talent Competition, and started writing songs for the album soon after, while still in school. Writing went on for 2 years. McKenna says, "There were a lot of changes, and I think you can hear that within some of the songs on the record. Quite a big part of the album is about change and being confused". He composed most of the album in his bedroom, except "Listen To Your Friends", which was written in Los Angeles. "Brazil" was written when he was 15. McKenna says, "The album is about me being playful and positive about not necessarily happy topics ... That's what I'm like as a character. I try not to be too distant from serious topics as well. The two go together." "Paracetamol" was written after learning about the suicide of transgender teen Leelah Alcorn and the media's representation of LGBT communities in general.

Title
When McKenna was four years old, his family got a new Toyota Previa. In a home video that captured the moment, McKenna's sister asks, "Dec, what do you think about the car?" to which he replies, "I think it's really good, and I'm going to sing my new album now." The album's opening song, "Humongous" has the audio clip of the exchange as its intro.

Critical reception

On Metacritic, which assigns a normalised rating out of 100 to reviews from mainstream critics, reported an average score of 76 based on 9 reviews, indicating "generally favorable reviews". Dork magazine writer Stephen Ackroyd calls the album, "one of the sharpest, most engaging debut albums of 2017. It's not showy – not really – but rather an extended hand into a world where anything feels possible" Dave Simpson of The Guardian calls the album a "cracking debut", noting, "They are protest songs, but sound anything but worthy or world-weary. Instead, they are sun-soaked aural fizz bombs which channel indie rock through his love of David Bowie and ABBA." Thea de Gallier of NME states McKenna, "he narrates his innermost feelings on everything from politics ('Isombard') to the media's treatment of transgender suicide ('Paracetamol') with subtlety and skill. Standout 'Make Me Your Queen' is a rare moment of intimacy as he laments the ache of unrequited love, again with a delicacy and wisdom beyond his years."

Track listing
All tracks written by Declan McKenna; track 11 co-written by Rostam Batmanglij. All tracks produced by James Ford, unless otherwise noted.

Personnel 
Adapted from liner notes.

Musicians

 Declan McKenna – writer
 Garrett Ray – drums
 Vanessa Freebarn-Smith – cello

Technical

 James Ford – producer (tracks 1, 3–9), mixer (track 8)
 Max Marlow – producer (track 2), mixer (track 2)
 Neil Comber – producer (track 10)
 Rostam Batmanglij – writer (track 11), producer (track 11)
 Jimmy Robertson – engineer (tracks 1, 3–9)
 Craig Silvey – mixer (tracks 1, 3–6, 7, 9–11)
 Eduardo De La Paz – mixer assistant (track 6)
 Barry Grint – mastering

Charts

Certifications

References

Declan McKenna albums
Columbia Records albums
2017 debut albums